Désiré is a French male given name.

Désiré may also refer to:
 Désiré (baritone) (1823–1873), French baritone
 Désiré (video game), a French adventure video game
 Désiré (1996 film), a French film
 Désiré (1937 film), a French comedy film
 Desiré or Désiré, an Old French Breton lai

See also
 Desire (disambiguation)